Helobata is a mostly Neotropical genus of water scavenger beetle in the family Hydrophilidae. It contains 13 described species, one of which is broadly distributed, reaching North America.

Taxonomy 
The genus Helobata was described for the first time by Ernst Evald Bergroth in 1888.

It belongs in the subfamily Acidocerinae and contains 13 described species.

Description 
Medium-sized beetles (4–7 mm), yellowish-brown to dark brown in coloration, with granulose surface, usually with a mottled or patterned appearance. The pronotum and elytra are flattened and broadly explanate. The maxillary palps are long. A complete diagnosis was presented by Girón and Short.

Habitat 
According to Girón and Short "Species of Helobata occur primarily in open habitats with abundant vegetation".

Species
The genus includes the following species:

 Helobata amazonensis Clarkson, Santos & Ferreira-Jr, 2016: Brazil (Amazonas, Roraima) 
Helobata aschnakiranae Makhan, 2007: Suriname
 Helobata bitriangulata García, 2000: Venezuela
 Helobata confusa Fernández & Bachmann, 1987: Argentina, Paraguay
 Helobata corumbaensis Fernández & Bachmann, 1987: Brazil (Mato Grosso, Mato Grosso do Sul)
 Helobata cossyphoides (Bruch, 1915): Argentina
 Helobata cuivaum García, 2000: Venezuela
 Helobata larvalis (Horn, 1873): Argentina, Bolivia, Brazil (Amazonas, Ceará, Mato Grosso, Mato Grosso do Sul,  Minas Gerais), Cuba, Guatemala, Mexico, Paraguay,  Venezuela. U.S.A. (California, Florida, Louisiana, Mississippi, North Carolina, South Carolina, Texas, Virginia).
 Helobata lilianae García, 2000: Venezuela
Helobata pantaneira Clarkson, Santos & Ferreira-Jr, 2016: Brazil (Mato Grosso) 
 Helobata perpunctata Fernández & Bachmann, 1987: Argentina
 Helobata quatipuru Fernández & Bachmann, 1987: Brazil (Minas Gerais, Pará, Rio de Janeiro) 
 Helobata soesilae Makhan, 2007: Suriname

References

Hydrophilidae genera
Taxa named by Ernst Evald Bergroth